The Mega Shark film series is made up of four monster and disaster films from The Asylum, an American independent film company and distributor that focuses on producing low-budget films. The movies in the series are:

 Mega Shark Versus Giant Octopus (2009), directed by Ace Hannah (a pseudonym for Jack Perez); starring Deborah Gibson and Lorenzo Lamas
 Mega Shark Versus Crocosaurus (2010), directed by Christopher Douglas-Olen Ray; starring Jaleel White, Gary Stretch, and Robert Picardo
 Mega Shark Versus Mecha Shark (2014), directed by Emile Edwin Smith; starring Christopher Judge and Elisabeth Röhm
 Mega Shark Versus Kolossus (2015), directed by Douglas-Olen Ray; Illeana Douglas, Amy Rider, and Brody Hutzler

The third film was direct to video; the others received limited theatrical releases.

See also
 List of killer shark films

References

The Asylum films
American film series
Film series introduced in 2009
Science fiction horror film series
American science fiction horror films
Films about shark attacks